David Austin was the first head football coach for the Middlebury College Panthers football program, where he served in 1907 and 1908. He compiled a record of 5–11–1.

Head coaching record

References

Year of birth missing
Year of death missing
Middlebury Panthers football coaches